South Carolina Highway 642 (SC 642, also known as Dorchester Road), is a  state highway in the southeastern part of the U.S. state of South Carolina. It travels within the Summerville and North Charleston areas.

Route description

Dorchester Road is a heavily congested highway during morning and evening traffic periods.

History

Current plans call for widening of the road from Summerville to US 17 Alternate. This has been completed.

Major intersections

See also

References

External links

SC 642 at Virginia Highways' South Carolina Highways Annex

642
Transportation in Dorchester County, South Carolina
Transportation in North Charleston, South Carolina